Monitor Latino (stylised monitorLATINO) is a singles chart founded in 2003 which ranks songs on chart based on airplay across radio stations in Latin American countries and Hispanic radio stations in the United States using the Radio Tracking Data, LLC in real time.

Monitor Latino started monitoring radio stations in Mexico and the United States in 2003. The company later expanded into other Latin American markets, and currently it monitors radio stations and issues music charts for 18 countries.

In January 2012, Monitor Latino began surveying radio stations in the Dominican Republic, Colombia, Ecuador, Venezuela, and Guatemala, publishing singles chart which were only accessible to subscribers. Since 2016, their complete charts are accessible to the general public, and an archive for their weekly charts after July 2014 is available on their website.

Monitor Latino hosts an annual award show which is held in Los Angeles, California. The company has its offices in Los Angeles and in Guadalajara, Mexico.

Number-one songs

Argentina
2016 – present

Bolivia
2016
2017
2018
2019
2020
2021

Chile
2021

Colombia
2018

Guatemala
2018

Mexico
2002-2007
2008
2009
2010
2011
2012
2013
2014
2015
2016
2017
2018
2019
2020
2021

Panama
2016
2017
2018
2019
2020
2021

Puerto Rico
2020

Venezuela
2018

Year-end charts

Latin America
In 2017, Monitor Latino introduced a general year-end chart for the 100 most-played songs in radio stations across Latin America. The first year-end chart measured data from 15 countries, a figure that increased to 19 as of 2019.

2017

2018

2019

Mexico
2008
2009
2010
2011
2012
2013
2014
2015
2016
2017
2018

Charts by country
Monitor Latino provides a total of seventy-three Airplay charts, distributed in eighteen countries and one region and sixteen music genres.

Argentina
 Top 20 General
 Top 20 Nacional
 Top 20 Latino
 Top 20 Anglo

Bolivia
 Top 20 General
 Top 20 Anglo
 Top 20 Latino

Brasil
 Top 20 General

Chile
 Top 20 General
 Top 20 Nacionalidad
 Top 20 Pop
 Top 20 Urbano
 Top 20 Popular
 Top 20 Tropical
 Top 20 Anglo

Colombia
 Top 20 General
 Top 20 Vallenato
 Top 20 Crossover
 Top 20 Pop
 Top 20 Tropical
 Top 20 Urbano
 Top 20 Popular
 Top 20 Anglo

Costa Rica
 Top 20 General
 Top 20 Urbano
 Top 20 Anglo

Dominican Republic
 Top 20 General
 Top 20 Bachata
 Top 20 Merengue
 Top 20 Salsa
 Top 20 Urbano
 Top 20 Pop
 Top 20 Anglo

Ecuador
 Top 20 General
 Top 20 Nacionalidad
 Top 20 Latino
 Top 20 Pop
 Top 20 Urbano
 Top 20 Tropical
 Top 20 Anglo

El Salvador
 Top 20 General
 Top 20 Pop
 Top 20 Anglo

Guatemala
 Top 20 General
 Top 20 Pop
 Top 20 Regional Mexicano
 Top 20 Anglo

Honduras
 Top 20 General
 Top 20 Pop
 Top 20 Urbano
 Top 20 Anglo

Latin America
 Top 20 América Latina Popular
 Top 20 América Latina Latino
 Top 20 América Latina Tropical

Mexico
 Top 20 General
 Top 20 Pop
 Top 20 Popular
 Top 20 Anglo

Nicaragua
 Top 20 General
 Top 20 Pop
 Top 20 Urbano
 Top 20 Anglo

Panama
 Top 20 General
 Top 20 Pop
 Top 20 Latino
 Top 20 Urbano
 Top 20 Tropical
 Top 20 Anglo

Paraguay
 Top 20 General
 Top 20 Pop
 Top 20 Urbano
 Top 20 Anglo

Peru
 Top 20 General
 Top 20 Pop
 Top 20 Urbano
 Top 20 Popular
 Top 20 Tropical
 Top 20 Anglo

Puerto Rico
 Top 20 General
 Top 20 Pop
 Top 20 Anglo
 Top 20 Urbano

United States
 Top 20 Mainstream
 Top 20 Regional Mexicano
 Top 20 Pop Rhythmic
 Top 20 Tropical
 Top 20 Anglo
 Top 20 Oldies

Uruguay
 Top 20 General
 Top 20 Anglo
 Top 20 Latino

Venezuela
 Top 20 General
 Top 20 Nacionalidad
 Top 20 Latino
 Top 20 Pop
 Top 20 Anglo
 Top 20 Urbano
 Top 20 Tradicional
 Top 20 Tropical
 Top 20 Vallenato

Other charts

Cristiano 
 Top 20 General

See also
Top 100 Mexico

References

External links
Official Site (In Spanish)
Charts

Publications established in 2003
Mexican record charts
Latin American music